The Great Indoors is an American sitcom television series created by Mike Gibbons, starring Joel McHale that aired on CBS from October 27, 2016 to May 8, 2017. The series is produced by Gibbons Bros. and Shiny Brass Lamp Productions in association with CBS Television Studios, with Gibbons serving as showrunner.

Premise
Jack Gordon has made a name for himself as an adventure reporter for the magazine Outdoor Limits. His days of exploring the world end when the magazine's founder, Roland, announces its move to web-only publishing and assigns Jack to its headquarters in Chicago to supervise the millennials who make up its online team.

Themes
The show explores a multigenerational workforce and the generation gaps arising among the tech-savvy Millennial online team, their Gen X supervisor Jack (Joel McHale), and the magazine's baby boomer publisher Roland (Stephen Fry).

Cast

Main
 Joel McHale as Jack Gordon: a globe-trotting adventure reporter now in charge of his magazine's publishing department
 Susannah Fielding as Brooke: Roland's daughter and Jack's current boss with whom he previously had a one-night stand 
 Christopher Mintz-Plasse as Clark Roberts: a tech nerd who idolizes Jack and knows everything about surviving unrealistic scenarios but has not been out of the city
 Chris Williams as Eddie: Jack's best friend, who runs the local bar and helps him understand his co-workers
 Christine Ko as Emma Cho: the social media expert who views Jack as the human version of dial-up
 Shaun Brown as Mason Trimmer: a hipster who has not spent any actual time outside; he's also bisexual.
 Stephen Fry as Roland: an outdoorsman in his own right and founder of the magazine
 Deborah Baker Jr. as Esther: the quirky receptionist in the Outdoor Limits office

Recurring
 Andrew Leeds as Paul
 Maggie Lawson as Rachel

Guest
 Amy Hill as Carol
 Tricia O'Kelley as Monica
 Barry Bostwick as Mather
 Jon Cryer as Donnie
 Chris D'Elia as Aaron Wolf
 Brian Jordan Alvarez as Brian
 Essence Atkins as Denise
 Jane Leeves as Sheryl
 Caitlin McGee as Kaylie

Episodes

Production
On January 29, 2016, CBS placed a pilot order, under the title The Great Indoors. The pilot was written by Mike Gibbons and directed by Andy Ackerman. On March 14, 2016, Chris Harris provided to join as the showrunner and EP of this pilot series. On May 13, 2016, CBS placed a series order.

The series premiered in the 2016–17 United States network television schedule and aired at 8:30 pm. Almost a month later on November 14, 2016, it was picked up for a full season of 19 episodes. On January 6, 2017, an additional 3 episodes were added, making it a 22 episode season.

On May 13, 2017, CBS canceled the show after one season.

Reception
The Great Indoors has received generally mixed reviews from television critics. Review aggregator website Rotten Tomatoes reported an approval rating of 45% based on 29 reviews, with an average rating of 5.1/10. The site's critical consensus reads, "The Great Indoors serves up one repetitive, formulaic joke, though the cast performs respectably within the significant constraints of the material." Metacritic reported a score of 51 out of 100, based on 27 critics, indicating "mixed or average reviews".

The show attracted criticism for portraying millennials as more easily offended and more sensitive than older generations.

Home media 
The complete series of The Great Indoors was released on DVD on November 28, 2018, via Amazon.

References

External links 
 
 

2010s American sitcoms
2010s American workplace comedy television series
2016 American television series debuts
2017 American television series endings
Television series about social media
CBS original programming
English-language television shows
Television series by CBS Studios
Television shows set in Chicago